Christine Ott (born 10 August 1963) is a French pianist, vocalist, ondist, and composer.

She was a member of Yann Tiersen's band for eight years and played in classical orchestras for ten. She has collaborated with Tindersticks, Syd Matters, and Jean-Philippe Goude.

Ott has released three solo albums: Solitude Nomade in 2009, Only Silence Remains in 2016, and Chimères (pour Ondes Martenot) in 2020. She also composed the soundtrack for F. W. Murnau's Tabu in 2016. She has created several live soundtracks shows, including for Lotte Reiniger's movies and Robert J. Flaherty's Nanook of the North.

Ott formed the duo Snowdrops with Mathieu Gabry in 2015. Together, they composed the original score for Manta Ray, by Phuttiphong Aroonpheng, and in 2020, they released the album Volutes, on Injazero Records. The Guardian selected the release among its ten best contemporary discs of 2020, writing, "what's remarkable is how radically different Christine Ott manages to make the ondes sound on each track: from a primeval, guttural sound on the 13-minute Odysseus to a chirruping boy soprano on Ultraviolet."

Discography

Solo works 
 2009 Solitude Nomade
 2016 Only Silence Remains
 2016 Tabu
 2020 Chimères (pour Ondes Martenot)
 2021 Time to Die

Snowdrops 
 2020 Volutes
 2021 Inner Fires

As guest or session musician 
 2004 Tout sera comme avant by Dominique A
 2004 Contre le centre by Mobiil
 2005 Le point de coté by Dominique Petitgand
 2005 Plays the Residents by Narcophony
 2005 Fragile by Têtes Raides
 2008 Aux solitudes by Jean-Philippe Goude
 2008 Ghost Days by Syd Matters
 2008 A l'attaque by Loïc Lantoine
 2008 Ersatz by Julien Doré
 2009 The dark age of love by This Immortal Coil
 2011 613 by Chapelier Fou
 2011 Tels Alain Bashung, Aucun express (Noir Désir)
 2012 Everything was story by Raphelson
 2013 Ghost Surfer by Cascadeur
 2016 Unworks & Rarities by Oiseaux-Tempête
 2017 Earth by Foudre! (side-project of Mondkopf, Saåad & Frédéric D. Oberland) 

As member of Yann Tiersen
 2001 L'Absente
 2001 Le fabuleux destin d'Amélie Poulain by Jean-Pierre Jeunet
 2002 C'était ici 
 2005 Les retrouvailles 
 2006 On Tour
 2008 Tabarly / Pierre Marcel

Soundtracks

Personal works
 2011 La fin du silence by Roland Edzard
 2016 Minute Bodies by Stuart Staples, Thomas Belhom and Christine Ott
 2018 Manta Ray (film) by Phuttiphong Aroonpheng, with Snowdrops

Collaborations
 2001 Swing / Tony Gatlif
 2008 35 rhums / Claire Denis by Tindersticks
 2010 Les Salauds by Tindersticks
 2011 Claire Denis Film Scores by Tindersticks
 2011 Ou va la nuit / Martin Provost by Hughes Tabar-Noval

Ciné-concerts and performances 
 2012 Tabu
 2013 Nanook of the North
 2013 24h of a Woman's Life with Michel Druez
 2014 Stories & Légends by Lotte Reiniger; "Lotte, mon amour"
 2016 Iranian Tales (with Snowdrops)

Classical music 
 1995 Les trois petites liturgies de la présence divine
 1997 Les Adieux by Marcel Landowski
 1998 il Mantello, opéra by Luciano Chailly
 1999 Ecuatorial by Edgard Varèse
 2013 Les Innatendus III (Ed Mickaël, Nocturne ; André Jolivet, Suite Delphique ; Arthur Honegger, Symphonie n°2 pour orchestre à cordes)

Videography 
 2005 Live with Radiohead
 2006 On Tour, Yann Tiersen
 2010 Carte blanche to Christine Ott, Neuilly Theater

References

External links 
 Christine Ott website: www.christineott.fr
 Christine Ott SoundCloud: soundcloud

1963 births
Living people
Musicians from Strasbourg
French classical musicians
Ondists
Avant-garde jazz musicians
French experimental musicians
French women jazz singers
French jazz singers
Electroacoustic music composers
Experimental composers
French film score composers
French women film score composers
Women film score composers
21st-century classical composers
Composers for piano
Postmodern composers
20th-century French musicians
20th-century French women singers
Conservatoire de Paris alumni
Academic staff of the Conservatoire de Paris
21st-century French composers
21st-century French women musicians
Women music educators
20th-century women composers
21st-century women composers